The 2023 Cantabrian regional election will be held on Sunday, 28 May 2023, to elect the 11th Parliament of the autonomous community of Cantabria. All 35 seats in the Parliament will be up for election. The election will be held simultaneously with regional elections in eleven other autonomous communities and local elections all throughout Spain.

Overview

Electoral system
The Parliament of Cantabria is the devolved, unicameral legislature of the autonomous community of Cantabria, having legislative power in regional matters as defined by the Spanish Constitution and the Cantabrian Statute of Autonomy, as well as the ability to vote confidence in or withdraw it from a regional president.

Voting for the Parliament is on the basis of universal suffrage, which comprises all nationals over 18 years of age, registered in Cantabria and in full enjoyment of their political rights. Additionally, Cantabrians abroad are required to apply for voting before being permitted to vote, a system known as "begged" or expat vote. The 35 members of the Parliament of Cantabria are elected using the D'Hondt method and a closed list proportional representation, with an electoral threshold of five percent of valid votes—which includes blank ballots—being applied regionally.

Election date
The term of the Parliament of Cantabria expires four years after the date of its previous election. Elections to the Parliament are fixed for the fourth Sunday of May every four years. The previous election was held on 26 May 2019, setting the election date for the Parliament on Sunday, 28 May 2023.

The president has the prerogative to dissolve the Parliament of Cantabria and call a snap election, provided that no motion of no confidence is in process, no nationwide election is due and some time requirements are met: namely, that dissolution does not occur either during the first legislative session or within the legislature's last year ahead of its scheduled expiry, nor before one year has elapsed since a previous dissolution. In the event of an investiture process failing to elect a regional president within a two-month period from the first ballot, the Parliament is to be automatically dissolved and a fresh election called. Any snap election held as a result of these circumstances will not alter the period to the next ordinary election, with elected deputies merely serving out what remains of their four-year terms.

Parliamentary composition
The table below shows the composition of the parliamentary groups in the Parliament at the present time.

Parties and candidates
The electoral law allows for parties and federations registered in the interior ministry, coalitions and groupings of electors to present lists of candidates. Parties and federations intending to form a coalition ahead of an election are required to inform the relevant Electoral Commission within ten days of the election call, whereas groupings of electors need to secure the signature of at least one percent of the electorate in Cantabria, disallowing electors from signing for more than one list of candidates.

Below is a list of the main parties and electoral alliances which will likely contest the election:

On 19 December 2019, Félix Álvarez resigned as leader of Citizens (CS) in Cantabria, citing "disagreements" with the party's leadership after a scandal broke out over the one-day hiring of Cs former leading candidate for the Congress of Deputies in the region, Rubén Gómez, a contract which Álvarez had publicly denied from having taken place.

Opinion polls
The tables below list opinion polling results in reverse chronological order, showing the most recent first and using the dates when the survey fieldwork was done, as opposed to the date of publication. Where the fieldwork dates are unknown, the date of publication is given instead. The highest percentage figure in each polling survey is displayed with its background shaded in the leading party's colour. If a tie ensues, this is applied to the figures with the highest percentages. The "Lead" column on the right shows the percentage-point difference between the parties with the highest percentages in a poll.

Graphical summary

Voting intention estimates
The table below lists weighted voting intention estimates. Refusals are generally excluded from the party vote percentages, while question wording and the treatment of "don't know" responses and those not intending to vote may vary between polling organisations. When available, seat projections determined by the polling organisations are displayed below (or in place of) the percentages in a smaller font; 18 seats are required for an absolute majority in the Parliament of Cantabria.

Results

Notes

References
Opinion poll sources

Other

Cantabria
Cantabria
2020s